"Kick It In" is the third single from the 1989 Simple Minds album
Street Fighting Years. The song reached the UK Top 20, peaking at #15.

The official music video for the song was directed by Andy Morahan.

Track listings
 7"  & Cassette Single
 "Kick It In" [7" Mix] - 4:44
 "Waterfront" ['89 Remix] - 5:24

 12" & CD Single
 "Kick It In" - 6:11
 "Waterfront" ['89 Remix] - 5:24
 "Big Sleep" [Live in Rehearsal, Dublin 1989] - 6:39

 Limited Edition 12" Gatefold Sleeve + Double Sided Poster
 "Kick It In" - 6:11
 "Waterfront" ['89 Remix] - 5:24
 "Kick It In" [Unauthorised Mix] - 7:02

References

1989 songs
Songs written by Jim Kerr
Songs written by Charlie Burchill
Songs written by Mick MacNeil
1989 singles
Music videos directed by Andy Morahan
Simple Minds songs
Song recordings produced by Trevor Horn
Song recordings produced by Stephen Lipson
Virgin Records singles